Marriage in Greece is allowed for both residents and non-residents of the country. Marriages may be civil or religious; civil marriages are performed by the mayor. In most cases religious ceremonies will be conducted by the Greek Orthodox church. Same-sex marriage is not recognized in Greece as of 2020.

Gallery

References

External links

Marriage, unions and partnerships in Greece
Greece
Greece